Srednji Statovac is a village in the municipality of Prokuplje, Serbia. According to the 2002 census, the village had a population of 38 people.

Demography 
Representation of population change. Left column represents year, right one represents number of people living in indicated area:

1953. 278 

1961. 245 

1971. 150 

1981. 96 

1991. 61 

2002. 38

References

Populated places in Toplica District